The White Tower is a  peak in British Columbia, Canada. 
It is part of the Tower of London Range of the Muskwa Ranges in the Canadian Rockies. 

The White Tower is named after the White Tower of the Tower of London.
Other mountains in the area are also named after the Tower, including North Bastion Mountain, South Bastion Mountain and Tower Mountain, which overlooks the south end of Wokkpash Lake.  These names were given by the Royal Fusiliers (City of London Regiment) Canadian Rocky Mountains Expedition 1960, a small expedition with members from a regiment based in the Tower of London.

References
Citations

Sources

Two-thousanders of British Columbia
White Towera
Peace River Land District